Brett Breitkreuz (born April 6, 1989) is a Canadian-German professional ice hockey player. He is currently playing for Löwen Frankfurt in the Deutsche Eishockey Liga (DEL).

Playing career 
As a junior player, he was active in the Western Hockey League and played his first season (2006-07) for the Kelowna Rockets. For the next season he was acquired by the new team in this league the Edmonton Oil Kings. In his second season for the Kings (2008-09), he scored 55 points (19 goals, 36 assists), was alternate captain and got with his team the play-offs for the first time in his history.

During the 2009-10 season, in January 2010, Breitkreuz was traded to the Vancouver Giants.

After his junior career, he moved to Germany, where his father came from, and previously played with Kölner Haie for three seasons before signing with the Augsburger Panther on a one-year contract on April 23, 2013.

On May 26, 2015, Breitkreuz moved to the German second tier DEL2, joining his brother Clarke Breitkreuz, in signing a one-year contract with Löwen Frankfurt.

Career statistics

References

External links

1989 births
Living people
Augsburger Panther players
SC Bietigheim-Bissingen players
Canadian ice hockey left wingers
Canadian expatriate ice hockey players in Germany
Edmonton Oil Kings players
Kelowna Rockets players
Kölner Haie players
Löwen Frankfurt players
Vancouver Giants players